Kanen Breen is an Australian operatic tenor.

Breen first performed with the Victoria State Opera, before roles with Opera Australia and Rodolfo in Baz Luhrmann's Broadway production of La bohème.

He performed with Jacqueline Dark in the cabaret Strange Bedfellows at the 2017 Adelaide Cabaret Festival.

He has received the Helpmann Award for Best Male Performer in a Supporting Role in an Opera three times, for Opera Australia's Partenope in 2011, for Saul at the Adelaide Festival in 2017 and for Pinchgut Opera's Coronation of Poppea in 2018.

References 

Year of birth missing (living people)
Place of birth missing (living people)
Living people
Helpmann Award winners
Australian operatic tenors
21st-century Australian male opera singers